Osman-pasha the Bosnian (died 1 August 1685) or the Herzegovinian, known as Osman-paša Kazanac, was an Ottoman statesman who served as the governor of the Damascus Eyalet (1676–1678, 1683), of Anatolia Eyalet (1678–1680), of Egypt Eyalet (1680–1683), of Diyarbekir Eyalet (1683), of Bosnia Eyalet (1684), and of Eğri Eyalet (1685). His byname suggests that he hailed from the Sanjak of Bosnia or the Sanjak of Herzegovina.

While governor of the Eğri Eyalet during the Great Turkish War, he was caught outside of the walls of the Castle of Eger when the Austrians began their siege, dying on August 1, 1685.

Osman-paša Kazanac (Osman-paša Hercegovac); as he was also known as, married a daughter of Kara Mustafa Pasha; with whom he had a number of sons.

See also
 List of Ottoman governors of Egypt
 List of Ottoman governors of Bosnia
 List of rulers of Damascus

References

Year of birth unknown
1685 deaths
17th-century Ottoman governors of Egypt
People from the Ottoman Empire of Bosnian descent
Bosnian Muslims from the Ottoman Empire
Ottoman governors of Egypt
Ottoman governors of Damascus
Ottoman governors of Bosnia
Ottoman governors of Anatolia